"Anywhere Away from Here" is a song by English singer-songwriter Rag'n'Bone Man and American singer-songwriter Pink. It was released as a digital download and for streaming on 9 April 2021 as the second single from Rag'n'Bone Man's second studio album Life by Misadventure.

Background
In a statement talking about the song, Rag'n'Bone Man said, "This song is an honest reflection of wanting to disappear from uncomfortable situations – about the vulnerabilities that we all face. It's an honour to have Pink on this record and I'm so glad she is able to be a part of it." Pink also said in a statement how she met Rag'n'Bone Man in Europe in 2017 after she first heard his 2016 single "Human", "By then I had already fallen in love with his voice, and when we met in person I quickly learned he has a beautiful soul too. Since then, I knew I wanted to work with him one day. 'Anywhere Away From Here' couldn't be a better song for us to sing together. I'm so honoured to be a part of this collaboration."

Critical reception
Rob Copsey from the Official Charts Company said, "Following Rag'n'Bone Man's rousing single All You Ever Wanted, we're in ballad territory here – and this is proper balladry of the heart-tugging, goosebump-inducing kind. Production is stripped back to little more than a piano, allowing the emotional grit and growl in each of their vocals to take full flight".

Music video
A music video to accompany the release of "Anywhere Away from Here" was first released onto YouTube on 9 April 2021.

Personnel
Credits adapted from Tidal.
 Ben Jackson-Cook – producer, composer, lyricist, piano
 Mike Elizondo – producer
 Rag'n'Bone Man – producer, composer, lyricist, associated performer
 Dan Priddy – composer, lyricist
 Mark Crew – composer, lyricist
 Simon Aldred – composer, lyricist
 Doug Clarke – assistant engineer
 Erica Block – assistant engineer
 Zachary Stokes – assistant engineer
 Pink – associated performer
 Pete Josef – background vocal
 Bill Banwell – bass
 Wendy Melvoin – electric guitar
 Jamie Sickora – engineer
 Lawson White – engineer
 Chris Gehringer – mastering engineer
 Adam Hawkins – mixing engineer

Charts

Certifications

Release history

References

2021 songs
2021 singles
Rag'n'Bone Man songs
Pink (singer) songs